In mathematical logic, an atomic formula (also known as an atom or a prime formula) is a formula with no deeper propositional structure, that is, a formula that contains no logical connectives or equivalently a formula that has no strict subformulas. Atoms are thus the simplest well-formed formulas of the logic. Compound formulas are formed by combining the atomic formulas using the logical connectives.

The precise form of atomic formulas depends on the logic under consideration; for propositional logic, for example, a propositional variable is often more briefly referred to as an "atomic formula", but, more precisely, a propositional variable is not an atomic formula but a formal expression that denotes an atomic formula. For predicate logic, the atoms are predicate symbols together with their arguments, each argument being a term.  In model theory, atomic formulas are merely strings of symbols with a given signature, which may or may not be satisfiable with respect to a given model.

Atomic formula in first-order logic
The well-formed terms and propositions of ordinary first-order logic have the following syntax:

Terms:
  ,

that is, a term is recursively defined to be a constant c (a named object from the domain of discourse), or a variable x (ranging over the objects in the domain of discourse), or an n-ary function f whose arguments are terms tk. Functions map tuples of objects to objects.

Propositions:
 ,

that is, a proposition is recursively defined to be an n-ary predicate P whose arguments are terms tk, or an expression composed of logical connectives (and, or) and quantifiers (for-all, there-exists) used with other propositions.

An atomic formula or atom is simply a predicate applied to a tuple of terms; that is, an atomic formula is a formula of the form P (t1 ,…, tn) for P a predicate, and the tn terms.

All other well-formed formulae are obtained by composing atoms with logical connectives and quantifiers.

For example, the formula ∀x. P (x) ∧ ∃y. Q (y, f (x)) ∨ ∃z. R (z) contains the atoms
 
 
 .
As there are no quantifiers appearing in an atomic formula, all occurrences of variable symbols in an atomic formula are free.

See also
 In model theory, structures assign an interpretation to the atomic formulas.
 In proof theory, polarity assignment for atomic formulas is an essential component of focusing.
 Atomic sentence

References

Further reading

Predicate logic
Logical expressions

de:Aussage (Logik)#einfache Aussagen - zusammengesetzte Aussagen